The capture of HMS Frolic  was a naval action fought in the Atlantic on 18 October 1812, between the sloop-of-war , commanded by Master Commandant Jacob Jones, and the  HM Brig Frolic, under Commander Thomas Whinyates. The Americans captured the British vessel, but both vessels shortly thereafter were captured by a British ship of the line which happened upon the scene of the battle.

Prelude
On 12 September 1812, a convoy of fourteen British merchant vessels left the Gulf of Honduras, bound for Britain and escorted by the Frolic. Frolics rigging was damaged, the main yard being carried away. During 17 October, the crew of the Frolic made some repairs, and by dark, six of the merchant sail had rejoined.

The American sloop of war USS Wasp had sailed from the Delaware River on 13 October and had run south-east to intercept ships sailing between Britain and the West Indies. It too had been slightly damaged by the gale on 16 October, losing its jib boom. At 11:30 pm on 17 October, the crew spotted several sails to the leeward (downwind). Jacob Jones, commanding the Wasp, kept his distance during the night, but at dawn he identified them as merchantmen, with a Royal Navy brig between them and Wasp (although Whinyates had hoisted Spanish ensigns  in an attempt to lure Wasp within range).

Battle

Although the weather had cleared, there was still a strong wind blowing and a heavy sea. Both vessels shortened sail and prepared for action. The crew of Frolic took down the jury mainyard and lashed it to the deck. Since both vessels carried a main armament of short-range carronades, there was no attempt at manoeuvering to gain advantage before the fight; instead, they closed to "within hail" (60 yards) and opened fire at 11:30 am, with the Wasp to the starboard and slightly to windward and the Frolic to port. The Wasps crew fired low, into their opponent's hull, while the Frolics gunners fired high, unusually for the Royal Navy, to disable their enemy's rigging. As the action continued, the ships closed together, until the American gunners struck the sides of the Frolic with their rammers as they reloaded.

After 22 minutes, Wasps rigging was badly damaged, with the main topmast, mizzen topgallant mast and gaff being shot away, and almost every brace severed, making the ship unmanageable. The Frolic was even more heavily damaged, and the crew had suffered very heavy casualties. With both vessels incapable of being handled, the Wasp drew slightly ahead and the Frolic collided with the American ship. The Wasp fired a final raking broadside which delivered the coup de grâce. At 11:52 am, American sailors boarded the Frolic to find that every British officer and over half the crew, 90 men, were wounded or dead. The Americans themselves had suffered only 10 casualties. Although it was acknowledged that the British crew had fought to their utmost, it was clear that the American gunnery had been far superior to that of the British.

Aftermath
Shortly after the fighting ended, both the Frolics masts fell. An American prize crew went aboard the Frolic and attempted to repair the rigging, but a few hours later a British 74-gun ship of the line,  (commanded by Captain John Beresford) came into view. Frolic was still unmanageable, and with its damaged rigging Wasp was soon overtaken and surrendered in the face of impossible odds. Beresford was due to join the fleet blockading the American coast, but thought it necessary to collect Frolics convoy and take them to Bermuda, where they were forced to remain for several days until another escort could be found.

Master Commandant Jacob Jones and his crew were soon released by an exchange of prisoners. Jones was promoted and appointed to command , which had been captured from the Royal Navy on 25 October. He later served as second in command to Commodore Isaac Chauncey on Lake Ontario.

Frolic had been too badly damaged to fight again and was broken up in November 1813. Wasp was taken into service in the Royal Navy as HMS Loup Cervier (renamed HMS Peacock in 1814), but disappeared off Virginia in 1814 and presumed wrecked.

Notes

References

External links
The War of 1812: The Wasp vs the Frolic

Frolic
October 1812 events